Witharen is a hamlet in the Dutch province of Overijssel. It is a part of the municipality of Ommen, and lies about 19 km south of Hoogeveen.

It was first mentioned in 1533 as "bij Witthaeren", and means "white sandy ridge".

References

Populated places in Overijssel
Ommen